Chlorobutanol (trichloro-2-methyl-2-propanol) is a preservative, sedative, hypnotic and weak local anesthetic similar in nature to chloral hydrate. It has antibacterial and antifungal properties. Chlorobutanol is typically used at a concentration of 0.5% where it lends long term stability to multi-ingredient formulations. However, it retains antimicrobial activity at 0.05% in water. Chlorobutanol has been used in anesthesia and euthanasia of invertebrates and fishes. It is a white, volatile solid with a camphor-like odor.

Synthesis 

Chlorobutanol was first synthesized in 1881 by the German chemist Conrad Willgerodt (1841–1930).

Chlorobutanol is formed by the reaction of chloroform and acetone in the presence of potassium or sodium hydroxide. It may be purified by sublimation or recrystallisation.

Toxicity 
Chlorobutanol is highly toxic to the liver, is a skin irritant and a severe eye irritant.

Parthenogenesis 

Chlorobutanol has proven effective at stimulating parthenogenesis in sea urchin eggs up to the pluteus stage, possibly by increasing irritability to cause stimulation. For the eggs of the fish Oryzias latipes, however, chlorobutanol only acted as an anesthetic.

Pharmacology
It is an anesthetic with effects related to isoflurane and halothane.

References

External links
Chlorobutanol MSDS

Hypnotics
Sedatives
Trichloromethyl compounds
Tertiary alcohols
GABAA receptor positive allosteric modulators
Glycine receptor agonists
Halohydrins